Paindong Union is a union of Fatikchhari Upazila of Chittagong District.

Geography
 Area : 7,209 acres (29.17 km2.)।

Location
 North: Bhujpur Thana and Manikchhari Upazila
 East:  Kanchan nagar Union
 South: Sundarpur Union
 West:  Harualchari Union

References
 Paindong Union details, lcgbangladesh.org

Unions of Fatikchhari Upazila